Scoliacma bicolora is a species of moth of the family Erebidae. It is known from Papua New Guinea and most of Australia, including the Australian Capital Territory, New South Wales, Queensland, South Australia, Tasmania and Victoria.

The wingspan is about 25 mm. Adults are half scarlet and half black.

The larvae feed on liverworts, mosses and lichens.

References

External links
CSIRO Ecosystem Sciences - Australian Moths Online

Lithosiina
Moths described in 1832